The Glogghüs is a mountain of the Urner Alps, located on the border between the Swiss cantons of Obwalden and Bern. On its northern side it overlooks the Melchsee and the village of Melchsee-Frutt.

Its elongated summit also represents the border between the municipalities of Kerns (Canton of Obwalden) and Hasliberg (Canton of Bern).

References

External links
 Glogghüs on Hikr

Mountains of the Alps
Mountains of Switzerland
Mountains of the canton of Bern
Mountains of Obwalden
Bern–Obwalden border
Two-thousanders of Switzerland
Kerns, Switzerland